Cold therapy  may refer to:

 Cold Therapy (band), a Polish electronic-music project
 Cold compression therapy, a combination of cold and pressure on injured tissue
 Cold therapy or Cryotherapy, the use of low temperatures in medical therapy
 Cold therapy or Ice bath, immersion in cold water after intense sports activity

See also
 Cryosurgery, the use of intense cold to remove lesions